El Capitán Malacara ("Captain Malacara") is a 1945 Mexican film directed by Carlos Orellana. It stars Pedro Armendáriz and Manolita Saval.

Cast
Pedro Armendáriz
Manolita Saval
Armando Soto La Marina
Amelia Wilhelmy
Mimí Derba
Elena D'Orgaz
Ramón Vallarino
Luis Alcoriza
Roberto Cañedo
Lauro Benítez
Manuel Noriega
Ramiro Gómez Kemp
Consuelo Segarra
Velia Martinez

References

External links
 

1945 films
1940s Spanish-language films
Films based on works by Pedro Antonio de Alarcón
Mexican black-and-white films
Mexican adventure films
1945 adventure films
1940s Mexican films